The Tour of America's Dairyland is a multi-day cycling race held annually in Wisconsin since 2009.

Winners

Men

Women

References

External links

Cycle races in the United States
Recurring sporting events established in 2009
2009 establishments in Wisconsin
Sports competitions in Wisconsin